Alysson Paolinelli is a Brazilian agronomic engineer and public official who received the 2006 World Food Prize for his role in transforming the Cerrado into productive cropland. Paolinelli was Brazil's Minister of Agriculture from 1974 to 1979.

References

Year of birth missing (living people)
Living people
Brazilian scientists
Place of birth missing (living people)
Agriculture and food award winners